The 85th 24 Hours of Le Mans was a 24-hour automobile endurance race held for teams of three drivers each entering Le Mans Prototype (LMP) and Le Mans Grand Touring Endurance (LMGTE) cars from 17 to 18 June 2017 at the Circuit de la Sarthe, near Le Mans before 258,500 spectators. The race's 85th running, organised by the Automobile Club de l'Ouest, was the third of nine rounds in the 2017 FIA World Endurance Championship.

Earl Bamber, Timo Bernhard, and Brendon Hartley drove a Porsche 919 Hybrid to victory, taking the lead in the final two hours. It was Bamber and Bernhard's second Le Mans victory, Hartley's first, and Porsche's 19th. Toyota's  Sébastien Buemi, Anthony Davidson, and Kazuki Nakajima finished eighth in a TS050 Hybrid after starting second, and were the only other competitors in the Le Mans Prototype 1 (LMP1) field to finish the race. Oliver Jarvis, Thomas Laurent and Ho-Pin Tung of Jackie Chan DC Racing's Oreca 07-Gibson won the Le Mans Prototype 2 (LMP2) category; they led the race for nearly two hours in the closing stages before finishing second overall. The second DC Racing entry of David Cheng, Tristan Gommendy and Alex Brundle finished third overall, three laps ahead of the Signatech Alpine of André Negrão, Nelson Panciatici, and Pierre Ragues.

The Aston Martin Vantage shared by Jonathan Adam, Daniel Serra, and Darren Turner overtook the stricken Chevrolet Corvette C7.R of Antonio García, Jan Magnussen, and Jordan Taylor in the final two laps to win the Le Mans Grand Touring Endurance Professional (LMGTE Pro) category for Aston Martin Racing. On the final lap, a Ford GT passed the Corvette to take second place for Pipo Derani, Andy Priaulx and Harry Tincknell. The JMW Motorsport Ferrari 488 GTE shared Robert Smith, Will Stevens, and Dries Vanthoor won the Le Mans Grand Touring Endurance Amateur (LMGTE Am) class. Spirit of Race's Marco Cioci, Duncan Cameron, and Aaron Scott and Scuderia Corsa's Townsend Bell, Cooper MacNeil, and Bill Sweedler completed the class podium for Ferraris in second and third.

Bamber, Bernhard and Hartley now led the World Endurance Drivers' Championship lead with 83 points, ahead of previous leaders Buemi, Nakajima and Davidson. Jarvis, Laurent and Tung moved to third after their LMP2-class victory. Derani, Priaulx and Tincknell stayed first in the GT World Endurance Drivers' Championship with Adam, Serra and Turner's category win moving them to second. Porsche overtook Toyota to lead the World Manufacturers' Championship by 28.5 points, as Ford passed Ferrari for the GT World Endurance Manufacturers' Championship lead with six races left in the season.

Background
The FIA World Motor Sport Council confirmed the date for the 2017 race at a press conference held by race organiser Automobile Club de l'Ouest (ACO) on June 16, 2016 at the Musée des 24 Heures du Mans. The event was held for the 85th time at the Circuit de la Sarthe from June 17 to 18, 2017, and the third of nine scheduled rounds of the 2017 FIA World Endurance Championship (FIA WEC). The race was scheduled to avoid clashes with other major motorsport events, which occurred in 2016 (when it was held the same day as the ).

Before the race, Toyota drivers Anthony Davidson, Kazuki Nakajima and Sébastien Buemi led the World Endurance Drivers' Championship with 50 points17 more than second-place Timo Bernhard, Earl Bamber and Brendon Hartley, and another five more than Neel Jani, Nick Tandy and André Lotterer in third. Toyota led the World Manufacturers' Championship with 69.5 points, seven-and-a-half ahead of second-place Porsche. Ford Chip Ganassi Racing's Pipo Derani, Andy Priaulx and Harry Tincknell led the GT World Endurance Drivers' Championship by two points over AF Corse's Sam Bird and Davide Rigon, and Ferrari led Ford by seven points in the GT World Endurance Manufacturers' Championship.

Regulation and circuit changes
Following the 2016 race, when the lead car failed on the final lap and was eventually not classified in the final results, the standards for car classification were changed. Instead of the mandatory six minutes for the race's final lap, penalties were assessed on a graduated scale for any lap exceeding six minutes. Failure to complete the race's final lap in under fifteen minutes no longer led a car being classified.

The Le Mans slow-zone system was also was also revised, with nine dedicated slow zones laid out around the circuit. Previously, individual marshal posts were used to mark the beginning and end of slow zones.

The circuit was modified from the Porsche Curves to the Ford Chicane. The run-off area where the last right-hand turn goes into the left-hand corner which begins the Corvette corner was widened, with the barrier at the Porsche Curves moved further back. The angle of the wall at the left-hand entry to the short straight before the Ford Chicane was also altered. The Le Mans Prototype 2 (LMP2) category was revamped with the introduction of a single specification engine from Gibson, with increased power output compared to 2016 LMP2 cars. Cockpit and chassis designs mimicked the Le Mans Prototype 1 (LMP1) regulations for safety. The four approved chassis manufacturers were Dallara, Ligier, Oreca and Riley.

Entries

Automatic invitations
Teams which won their class in the 2016 24 Hours of Le Mans or won championships in the European Le Mans Series (ELMS), Asian Le Mans Series (ALMS) and GT3 Le Mans Cup (GT3 LMC) earned automatic invitations. The ELMS Le Mans Grand Touring Endurance (LMGTE) championship runner-up received an automatic invitation. The ACO gave two participants selected from the IMSA SportsCar Championship (IMSA) automatic entries, regardless of performance or category. When teams received invitations, they were allowed to cars (but not their category) from the previous year. The LMGTE-class invitations from the ELMS and ALMS allowed a choice between the Pro and Am categories. ELMS' Le Mans Prototype 3 (LMP3) champion was required to field an entry in LMP2, and the ALMS LMP3 champion could choose between LMP2 or LMGTE Am. The GT3 LMC champions were limited to the LMGTE Am category. The ACO issued its initial list of automatic entries on 23 January 2017.

Entry list and reserves

In conjunction with the announcement of entries for the 2017 FIA WEC and the ELMS seasons, the ACO announced the full 60-car entry list for Le Mans and two reserves. In addition to the 28 guaranteed WEC entries, 13 entries came from the ELMS, six from IMSA and eleven from the ALMS; the rest of the field was filled with one-off entries only competing at Le Mans. Two cars were initially named to the reserve list; RLR Msport later withdrew their LMP2 Ligier, and a fourth entry (from Proton Competition) was not promoted to the race. The withdrawal of Audi Sport Team Joest from LMP1 reduced the class to six entries for the race.

Garage 56 
The Garage 56 concept, which began in 2012 to test new technology at Le Mans, was to be continued by the ACO. Welter Racing intended to enter a three-cylinder  prototype vehicle powered by biomethane fuel, stored in cryogenic tanks which could withstand very low temperatures, to concentrate and maximise fuel volume. Due to funding issues, the car was not entered in the race.

Pre-race balance of performance changes
The ACO and the FIA altered the balance of performance (BoP) in the two LMGTE categories in an attempt to eliminate sandbagging. To reduce performance, the Ford GT received a  minimum weight increase and reduced turbocharger boost across all RPM levels. All three cars had minor power and restrictor adjustments.

Testing

On June 4, the circuit held two mandatory four-hour sessions as part of a pre-Le Mans testing day. The morning session, held on a dirty track with lap times improving throughout, was led by pre-race favourite Toyota; Nakajima's  8 car lapped at 3 minutes 20.778 seconds. The second Toyota of Kamui Kobayashi was almost seven-tenths of a second slower, and José María López's No. 9 car was third. Porsche were more than two seconds slower than Toyota, and completed the LMP1 field with Bernhard fourth and Lotterer fifth. Oreca 07s led LMP2 with 13 cars leading the time sheets, led by André Negrão's No. 36 Signatech Alpinethe sole driver to lap below 3 minutes 30 seconds with a 3-minutes 29.809-second lap, ahead of Rebellion and Graff. LMGTE Pro was topped by Corvette with Jan Magnussen's lap of 3 minutes 55.726 seconds, followed by Patrick Pilet's No. 91 Porsche and the second Corvette of Oliver Gavin. Matteo Cairoli's No. 77 Porsche led LMGTE Am from Andrea Bertolini's DH Racing Ferrari.

Toyota led the second session with Kobayashi's 3-minute 18.132-second lap, followed by Buemi and López. Porsche remained slower than Toyota with their best lap coming from Bamber's No. 2 car, followed by Jani's No. 1 entry. Nelson Panciatici's No. 35 Signatech Alpine lapped faster in LMP2 than Jean-Éric Vergne's No. 24 Manor and Alex Brundle's No. 37 Jackie Chan DC Racing entry to lead the sole LMP1 privateer (Dominik Kraihamer's No. 4 ByKolles Racing ENSO CLM P1/01). Gavin missed 91 minutes due to a mid-session engine change but set the day's best LMGTE Pro lap (3 minutes 54.701 seconds) towards the end of the test, beating Frédéric Makowiecki's No. 92 Porsche. Aston Martin led LMGTE Am with Pedro Lamy's 3-minutes 58.250-second lap from Fernando Rees' Larbre Compétition Corvette. Erik Maris' No. 33 Eurasia Motorsport Ligier JS P217 stopped the session by becoming stranded in the Dunlop Curves gravel trap. Paul-Loup Chatin's No. 17 IDEC Sport Ligier and Jan Lammers's Racing Team Nederland Dallara collided at the second Mulsanne Chicane, but both continued without major damage. The session ended less than fifteen minutes early, when Roberto González's No. 25 Manor laid oil on the track and stopped.

Post-testing balance of performance changes 
After testing, the FIA re-adjusted the BoP. The LMGTE Pro-category Corvettes had their performance reduced with an air-restrictor reduction. The Aston Martins, Ferraris, Fords, and Porsches received fuel-capacity increases to equalise refuelling times and stint lengths. The LMGTE Am-class Aston Martin and Ferraris increased their fuel capacity, with the Ferraris receiving turbocharger boost pressure increases.

Practice 
Practice was held on 14 June, with all 60 cars on the circuit for four hours in hot and sunny weather. Toyota led from the start once again, with Nicolas Lapierre setting the early pace and leading for most of the session until Bamber went faster. Kobayashi improved until Jani's lap of 3 minutes 20.362 seconds with five minutes remaining led the session. Alex Lynn's No. 26 G-Drive Racing car led LMP2 with less than forty minutes left, with a 3-minute 30.363-second lap from Nelson Piquet Jr.'s No. 13 Rebellion. Bruno Senna's sister No. 31 Rebellion was third. LMGTE Pro was led by Aston Martins and Corvettes from the start until Bird's No. 71 AF Corse Ferrari lapped fastest at 3 minutes 54.832 seconds. Darren Turner's No. 97 Aston Martin, and James Calado's second AF Corse car were second and third, respectively. Over three DH Racing Ferraris, Lamy's No. 98 Aston Martin was the fastest LMGTE Am car. After Christian Philippon's Larbre Compétition Corvette left the Porsche Curves off the track and hit the tyre barrier, the safety cars were needed for 75 minutes. Stephane Lemeret's No. 88 Proton Porsche scraped a barrier through the Porsche Curves, but continued to the pit lane for repairs. Roberto Lacorte slid the Cetilar Villorba Corse Dallara into the Mulsanne corner gravel trap, and abandoned the car.

Qualifying

Beginning late Wednesday night in clear conditions, the first of three qualifying sessions commenced. Due to a significant practise incident in the first Road to Le Mans race, the start was delayed by 20 minutes for barrier repairs at the Porsche Curves. Slow zones and yellow flags limited the amount of quick running, and the rapidly-cooling track meant that the best chance to set the fastest lap times was missed. The session's first timed laps saw Porsche lead early on with a benchmark effort from Jani, followed by Bernhard's 3-minute 19.710-second lap. Fifteen minutes later, Kobayashi had no slower traffic impeding him and took provisional pole position with a 3-minute 18.793-second lap. Nakajima was six-tenths of a second behind in second, and Bernhard was a provisional third. Lapierre was the slowest of the three Toyotas in fourth, and Jani was fifth. Kraihamer completed the LMP1 field with a lap that was ten seconds slower than Kobayashi's time but clear of the LMP2 field.

Matthieu Vaxivière put TDS Racing's Oreca on provisional pole in LMP2 with a 3-minute 29.333-second lap set late in the session. He was half-a-second clear of Senna, who held the class pole until Vaxivière's lap. Vitaly Petrov's No. 25 Manor was third-fastest, with teammate Vergne fourth. Eric Trouillet, in the No. 39 Graff Oreca, caused the session's first yellow flag when he struck the barriers leaving the second Mulsanne Chicane. The No. 27 SMP Racing Dallara caused further disruption when it hit the barriers and had a quickly-extinguished fire. Aston Martin led the LMGTE categories, with Nicki Thiim's No. 95 car quickest at 3 minutes, 52.117 seconds; Mathias Lauda was the fastest Amateur-class entry with a 3-minute 55.134-second lap. Risi Competizione's No. 82 Ferrari 488 was eleventh amongst the LMGTEs before ACO officials disallowed their fastest laps for violating parc fermé regulations by handling the tyres after the session.

Thursday's first qualifying session began with a stoppage for a crash. Maris spun and crashed his No. 33 car against the outside barriers leaving the first Mulsanne Chicane 17 minutes in. He was unhurt, but was transported to the medical centre for a precautionary check-up; this meant that the organisers rescheduled the second qualifying to end at 21:30 Central European Summer Time (CEST) (UTC+02:00). When it restarted, Kobayashi exited the pit lane early; aided by tailwinds on the Mulsanne Straight and headwinds through the Porsche Curves, he reset the track lap record to 3 minutes 14.791 seconds. The No. 8 Toyota stopped leaving the second Mulsanne Chicane with an oil-supply problem which required an engine change. The Toyota returned to the track with ten minutes remaining, but fell to fourth as Buemi could not better its best time. Jani and Bernhard in the two Porsches lapped quicker, and moved to second and third. Yuji Kunimoto also improved the No. 9 Toyota's best lap, but fell to fifth.

Petrov's Manor set a new LMP2 class lap record of 3 minutes 25.549 seconds, more than a second faster than rookie Thomas Laurent in DC's No. 38 entry and Vergne's second Manor; Petrov demoted the ByKolles car to seventh overall. The LMGTE categories had some changes, with Aston Martin remaining the Pro leader; Jonathan Adam bettered Thiim's first session lap, with Calado improving to second. Euan Hankey became the provisional LMGTE Am pole-sitter before Will Stevens went faster to take the class pole. Timothé Buret lost control of the No. 23 Panis Barthez Competition Ligier on the grass and was stranded in a gravel trap going into Tertre Rouge corner after striking the barrier with half-an-hour left in qualifying.

As temperatures cooled for the final session, more than half the field improved their fastest laps but Kobayashi's time was not bettered. He took Toyota's third pole position at Le Mans and their first since 2014. Nakajima lapped more than two seconds faster, putting the No. 8 Toyota alongside the sister No. 7 car. Porsche failed to improve from the second session, finishing third and fourth. Hartley slowed and stopped the No. 2 Porsche at Indianapolis corner due to a rising oil temperature. He abandoned the car after failing to return to the pit lane on hybrid power. Lapierre improved early on, and was fifth. Oliver Webb used clear air to return the ByKolles car to sixth overall. Lynn reset the LMP2 lap record early on by 11.3 seconds over the 2016 time, demoting the No. 25 Manor Oreca to second. Ho-Pin Tung's No. 38 DC car took third, battling with Senna for the position. The Oreca chassis, as well as the variant Alpine chassis, secured the first nine positions in LMP2; the Dallara of SMP Racing was the fastest of the other chassis, in tenth place.

Aston Martin led LMGTE Pro, with Richie Stanaway setting a new class record before Turner improved with a 3-minute 50.837-second lap for Aston Martin's first class pole since 2015. Calado separated the two cars in the closing minutes, and Bird came within 0.048 seconds of Stanaway. All five manufacturers in LMGTE Pro were within a second of Turner's lap, with the fastest Ford in fifth courtesy of Ryan Briscoe; Antonio García sixth for Corvette, and Porsche seventh courtesy of Michael Christensen. The LMGTE Am lead changed with Rees earning Larbre Compétition's first class pole in ten years with a 3-minute 52.843-second lap, almost four-tenths of a second clear of Lamy's No. 98 Aston Martin and Townsend Bell's No. 62 Scuderia Corsa Ferrari.

Post-qualifying 
After qualifying, the FIA imposed an  BoP ballast decrease on the LMGTE Am-category Porsches after they were  slower on the straight; Porsche had requested a longer air restrictor for better performance.

Qualifying results
Provisional pole positions in each class are denoted in bold. The fastest time set by each entry is denoted with a gray background.

Warm-up
A 45-minute warm-up session was held on Saturday morning. Nakajima's No. 8 Toyota set the fastest lap at 3 minutes 18.308 seconds; Kobayashi's sister Toyota was three-tenths of a second slower in second. The best-placed Porsche was Tandy's No. 1 car in third, having led for most of the session. Kunimoto was fourth-fastest, and Hartley was fifth. Lynn set the fastest LMP2 lap at 3 minutes 27.096 seconds. Briscoe' No. 69 Ford was quickest in LMGTE Pro, with Bertolini's No. 83 DH Racing Ferrari fastest in LMGTE Am by over a second. Paul Lafargue oversteered the No. 17 IDEC car in the Porsche Curves, made contact with the barriers before stopping in the gravel trap, and returned to the pit lane for repairs.

Race

Start to evening

Formula One Group's chair and chief executive Chase Carey waved the French tricolour to begin the race before 258,500 spectators with a rolling start at 15:00 local time. Mike Conway maintained the No. 7 Toyota's pole-position advantage for most of the first hour, before Buemi overtook him on the outside into Indianapolis turn for the lead after Conway made a braking error at the Dunlop Esses. The first retirement occurred during the opening hour when Webb's No. 4 ByKolles car hit the wall at Tetre Rouge corner after suffering a front-left puncture, damaging both its front bodywork and engine. Thiim put the No. 95 Aston Martin in the LMGTE Pro lead at the end of the hour after Alessandro Pier Guidi moved the No. 95 AF Corse Ferrari to the category lead for the first two laps before dropping to third in class.

Rees briefly passed Hand's No. 68 LMGTE Pro-class Ford, and Rees led the LMGTE Am field until Bell's No. 62 Scuderia Corsa Ferrari took the lead due to a faster pit stop. As the class pole-sitter No. 26 G-Drive Oreca of Roman Rusinov dropped to 14th at the start, the LMP2 lead became a multi-team battle between the No. 38 DC car and the Nos. 13 and 31 Rebellion Racing teams between pit stop cycles. Rusinov caught Khaled Al Qubaisi's No. 88 Proton Porsche and lapped him in the middle of the Porsche Curves before both drivers crashed into the SAFER barrier at high speed. Although both cars could be driven to the pit lane, they had severe damage and were retired. The accident triggered the race's first localised slow-zone procedure to enable repairs to the barrier. On the Mulsanne Straight, Conway retook the overall lead in the No. 7 Toyota when his teammate (Buemi, in the sister No. 8 car) went wide at Mulsanne turn. 

Laurent's No. 38 DC car was gaining on the two LMP2-leading Rebellion cars when its rear snapped out and he crashed lightly against the barrier at Indianapolis corner. Laurent entered the pit lane for new front bodywork, but the car lost two-and-a-half-minutes and fell to sixth place. After Marco Sørensen relieved Thiim in the No. 95 Aston Martin, he was slowed by a left-rear puncture from debris at Tertre Rouge corner. Sørensen relinquished the LMGTE Pro lead to Daniel Serra's sister No. 97 Aston Martin, with the No. 67 Ford in second. After three-and-a-half hours, Bamber's No. 2 Porsche was forced to the garage for 65 minutesand 18 lapsto fix a failed front-axle hybrid harvesting motor which required multiple components (including the motor generator unit). Tandy's No. 1 Porsche overtook Davidson's No. 8 Toyota for second overall after a pit-stop cycle, challenging the No. 7 Toyota for the lead.

Vaxivière unsettled the front of his TDS Racing Oreca while braking for the first Mulsanne chicane and moved left towards Pierre Kaffer's unseen No. 82 Risi Ferrari, which he was lapping in traffic. In the ensuing collision, Kaffer hit the Armco barrier at high speed, forcing the No. 82 car stopped in the run-off area to retire. Kaffer was unhurt, but a lengthy slow zone was imposed to allow for barrier repairs; Vaxivière received a seven-minute stop-and-go penalty for the accident. Following several incidents that left gravel on the circuit, the slow zone was extended past the Dunlop chicane to the Tetre Rouge turn. The slowdown brought the leading cars together and Senna extend the No. 31 LMP2 Rebellion Oreca car's lead to over 90 seconds over his teammate, Piquet, in the second-place No. 13 entry. Tung's recovering No. 38 DC car was third in class, passing Pierre Ragues' No. 35 Signatech Alpine. Although Kunimoto had to make an unscheduled pit stop to repair a loose right-side door, the No. 9 Toyota remained fourth.

Night to dawn

Midway through the seventh hour, Nakajima's No. 8 Toyota passed Lotterer's No. 1 Porsche for second place overall because it was lapping faster as night fell. Nakajima immediately began to pull clear of Lotterer and gain on Sarrazin's race-leading No. 7 Toyota. The No. 98 Aston Martin relinquished its lead in the LMGTE Am category to the No. 84 JMW Ferrari of Stevens when Lamy had a front-right puncture from debris. This removed the bodywork from the car's front-right corner, and Lamy dropped to the rear of the category when he made an unscheduled 18-minute pit stop for repairs. Senna's No. 31 Rebellion car received a drive-through penalty for passing another car in a slow zone. He dropped from the lead of LMP2 to third, and his teammate Piquet, driving the No. 13 Rebellion entry, became the new class leader.

Buemi was battling Jani's No. 1 Porsche when the No. 8 Toyota began to leak oil, but telemetry indicated no issues. Due to a battery-damaging axle hybrid motor failure emitting smoke from the front-right wheel arch, he lost 29 laps and nearly two hours while components were changed in the garage. The left rear of Tommy Milner's No. 64 Corvette was damaged in a spin towards the barrier at the exit of the Porsche Curves due to an incorrectly-fitted left rear wheel nut when Milner, struggling to control the car, spun into the pit lane entry gravel. The car was beached on a kerb and extricated by a recovery vehicle, but Tincknell's No. 67 Ford took second in the LMGTE Pro. Piquet's No. 13 Rebellion car lost the lead in LMP2 to Senna's sister No. 31 car when it spent a minute in the pit lane to repair a failed left rear tail light. Olivier Pla beached the No. 66 Ford at the left-hand turn gravel run-off area after the Indianapolis corner early in the tenth hour; it was recovered, leaving gravel on the racing line. The incident led to the race's first safety car's a half-hour for debris removal.

During the slow period, Jani spun the No. 1 Porsche at the pit-lane entry but did not lose position. When Kobayashi brought the race-leading No. 7 Toyota to the pit-lane exit, Algarve Pro Racing driver Vincent Capillare ran up to the car and gave Kobayashi the thumbs-up signal. Kobayashi interpreted this as a marshal's signal to exit the lane, but further confusion was created when Toyota radioed Kobayashi to stop the car because he had passed a red light. When racing resumed, Kobayashi had worn out the clutch enough to brake it and slowed; the clutch, not designed for starting, was stressed by the engine's power and torque. Kobayashi lost drive in the engine and attempted to return to the pit lane on hybrid power, but got as far as the pit lane entry straight before retiring the No. 7 car because of a low battery charge. The No. 7 Toyota's retirement promoted Tandy's No. 1 Porsche to the race lead, Lapierre's No. 9 Toyota to second and Rebellion's No. 31 LMP2-class-leading entry to third overall.

Soon after, in the Dunlop Chicane, Simon Trummer's No. 25 Manor Oreca and Lapierre's No. 9 Toyota's left and right rear corners collided. Trummer retired the No. 25 car in the gravel with major damage, but was unhurt; Lapierre continued with a left-rear puncture which caused the bodywork to fail. Lapierre drove too fast, and rubber chunks from the disintegrating tyre's rim damaged the gearbox hydraulics and an oil line. The car briefly caught fire as a result, and Lapierre drove on hybrid power before being asked by his team to stop near the pit-lane entry and abandon the car on the side of the circuit. As debris from the two stricken cars was removed from the track, safety cars were required for another 32 minutes. The No. 9 Toyota's retirement moved the Nos. 31 and 13 Rebellion cars to second and third overall. When racing resumed, Tandy slowed the race-leading No. 1 Porsche because he had a nine-lap lead over the LMP2 order. Hankey's No. 90 TF Sport Aston Martin fended off Marvin Dienst's No. 77 Dempsey-Proton Porsche for third in LMGTE Am, with second to fourth in class covered by ten seconds.

After the race's halfway point, Nicolas Prost's No. 31 Rebellion Oreca car entered the garage for an inspection due to reported a gearbox problem. The inspection took five minutes, and the car dropped to fourth in LMP2 (giving Tung's No. 38 DC car the category lead). Christensen lost control of the No. 92 Porsche on the Ford Chicane kerb, heavily damaging the car's rear on the tyre barrier before stopping in the gravel and retired behind the barrier. The safety cars were deployed for the third and final time (for 24 minutes) to allow for barrier repairs and the extrication of the stricken car after Emmanuel Collard crashed the No. 28 TDS Oreca into the tyre wall exiting the Porsche Curves at high of speed. Collard sustained bruising and exited the car unaided; he was transported to the medical centre and then Le Mans Hospital for checks. AF Corse were caught out by the safety car's timing and brought both their cars into the pit lane, moving the No. 63 Corvette to fourth in LMGTE Pro.

Morning to finish

After green-flag racing resumed in the early morning, a slow zone was imposed when James Allen beached the No. 40 Graff entry in the gravel trap on the left-hand Indianapolis turn after contact with the barrier and was pushed back onto the circuit. The slow zone lowered the gap between Sørensen's LMGTE Pro-leading No. 95 Aston Martin and Pilet's second-placed No. 92 Porsche to less than 20 seconds. Because the manufacturers used different tyre brands, the Aston Martin and Porsche LMGTE Pro teams had different pit-stop strategies: the Aston Martins could do two stints on their tyres, while the Porsches could do three. Tung used the slow zone to return the No. 38 DC car to the LMP2 lead when Piquet's No. 13 Rebellion entry lost a minute in it. Calado's No. 51 AF Corse Ferrari had to drop out of the LMGTE Pro lead battle when Calado and Rob Bell's No. 90 TF Aston Martin collided at the second Mulsanne chicane; they went to the garage to repair front bodywork damage and a rear diffuser replacement, respectively.

The No. 95 Aston Martin relinquished the LMGTE Pro lead to Jordan Taylor's No. 63 Corvette which cycled to Makowiecki's No. 92 Porsche on pit-stop rotation when driver Stanaway, on cold tyres after a scheduled pit stop, damaged the car's left front corner against the tyre wall at the Mulsanne hairpin. Stanaway drove to the pit lane for quick repairs, and was relieved by Thiim. The No. 31 Rebellion car stopped in the garage for more than an hour to replace gearbox internals, which promoted Panciatici's No. 35 Signatech Alpine to third in LMP2. Will Owen, driving United Autosports' No. 32 car, was fourth in LMP2 when he spun twice (at Indianapolis corner and the Porsche Curves) and was passed by David Cheng's No. 37 DC entry. Dries Vanthoor lost control of JMW's Ferrari at the pit-lane entry, but retained the LMGTE Am lead. The recovering No. 2 Porsche made its way to fifth overall with Hartley aboard by the 20th hour, and the LMGTE Pro lead battle was between three cars: the No. 97 Aston Martin, the No. 63 Corvette and the No. 91 Porsche.

Lotterer's No. 1 Porsche slowed at the Dunlop Curves after 21 hours and 10 minutes when the engine lost oil pressure. Lotterer attempted to return to the pit lane on hybrid power, but was advised to stop and abandon the car on the Mulsanne Straight when Porsche believed the problem could not be fixed and did not want a slow zone or safety car to slow Hartley. Laurent's LMP2-category-leading No. 38 DC Oreca car moved to the race lead after the No. 1 Porsche retired, making him the first LMP2 overall leader in race history. Mathias Beche (second overall) received a stop-and-go while adjusting the brake duct and rear of the No. 13 Rebellion vehicle, and he fell behind Hartley's recovering No. 2 Porsche. Laurent lost a minute in the pit lane when the No. 38 DC car's rear bodywork was changed to repair faulty rear brake lights before Bernhard unlapped the Oreca entry to return the No. 2 Porsche to the lead lap, as he was lapping significantly faster on average than the LMP2 car.

Piquet's No. 13 Rebellion car battled Negrão's No. 35 Signatech Alpine for third overall in slower traffic before Piquet's pace unsettled his vehicle through the Porsche Curves and allowed Negrão to pull clear. The Rebellion entry received a ten-second time penalty for Piquet's collision with the No. 49 ARC Bratislava Ligier, and it fell back from the Alpine. Makowiecki's No. 91 Porsche exited the LMGTE Pro race after suffering a left-front puncture and making an unscheduled pit stop. Bernhard closed up on Tung's No. 38 DC Oreca car and overtook it on the inside on the right-hand kink into Indianapolis turn for the race lead with just over one hour remaining. Negrão lost the No. 35 Signatech Alpine's hold on third overall to Piquet's No. 13 Rebellion car in the final hour when he slowly beached the Alpine in the gravel at Arnage corner while attempting to rejoin the circuit. Adam's No. 97 Aston Martin attempted to pass Taylor's No. 63 Corvette for the LMGTE Pro lead, but ran wide and hit the Corvette. He tried again after Taylor drove across the gravel trap at the second Mulsanne Straight chicane and took the category lead on the start-finish straight with two laps remaining, which he maintained to the finish.

The No. 2 Porsche team led for the remainder of the race, winning after 367 laps, earning Bamber and Bernhard their second Le Mans victories, Hartley his first and Porsche its 19th. Toyota was able to repair the No. 8 car sufficiently to finish eighth overall and the final LMP1 finisher, nine laps behind the winning Porsche. The No. 38 DC Oreca entry led the final 141 laps of LMP2 to win the category and finish second overall, a lap down. Rebellion's No. 13 car finished provisionally second and third overall, with DC's No. 37 car completing the class podium. Aston Martin secured their first LMGTE Pro Le Mans victory, with Turner taking his third category win and Adam and Serra their first. Tincknell's No. 67 Ford took second in class with a last-lap pass of Taylor's No. 63 Corvette, which had bodywork damage and a slow front-left puncture. JMW, unchallenged since the race's eighth hour, won the LMGTE Am class with the No. 84 Ferrari leading the last 234 laps. The Spirit of Race and Scuderia Corsa Ferraris completed the category podium, two laps behind in second and third.

Post-race 
The top three teams in each of the four classes appeared on the podium to collect their trophies, and spoke to the media at a later press conference. Bamber called Porsche's victory "incredibly nerve-wracking", "a great fightback from us, and one of those fairytale Le Mans stories I think." Hartley added, "You can't write these stories. It's Le Mans. It's always unpredictable. Sometimes at the beginning of the race you don't believe that such a story exists. But it did." Oliver Jarvis said, "We can't be disappointed winning LMP2 and finishing second, but there was a moment when I saw the #1 Porsche at the side of the track and thought we could actually win! It would have been incredible." Tung called the LMP2 victory "extremely important. Not just to win here at Le Mans, it's so special, but also for the World Endurance Championship, it's a very important race." Jota Sport team director Sam Hignett said an LMP2 car winning overall might have been "legendary" with "a little bit more luck", but the team was delighted to achieve its objectives. Actor Jackie Chan equated his team's class victory to his winning an Academy Award. FIA president Jean Todt said that LMP2 cars driven by unknown drivers leading the race and finishing on the overall podium were "great for racing".

After the race, third-place-overall finisher No. 13 Rebellion Oreca was disqualified by race officials after it was found that the team had modified its rear bodywork by cutting a hole to allow them to access a faulty starter motor; it was declared an unnecessary modification of approved bodywork. The disqualification moved the second Jackie Chan DC Racing car to third place overall, and second in class. Rebellion Racing issued a statement admitting an "error of judgement". Rusinov was assessed a three-minute penalty at the following 6 Hours of Nürburgring, with three additional stop-and-go penalties suspended for the following three FIA WEC events, for his second-hour collision with Al-Qubaisi's Porsche. Rusinov called the penalty a "very harsh decision", saying that he had apologised to Al-Quabisi and his team; Al-Quabisi told Rusinov that he would have allowed him past at the next corner.

Toyota president Akio Toyoda suggested that hybrid technology may not yet have been developed enough to cope with the event's demands. Oreca president Hugues de Chaunac echoed Toyoda, suggesting that hybrid systems be less convoluted. Porsche team principal Andreas Seidl felt that the hybrid failures were a consequence of faster racing, and Porsche had not experienced such problems. Jarvis said that ACO rule changes attempting to slow the LMP1 hybrid cars were ineffective and impaired reliability. Capillaire apologised to Toyota (which was accepted) for indirectly causing the No. 7 car's retirement, saying that he ran across the pit lane to encourage Kobayashi. Kaffer accepted an apology from Vaxivière for the incident which took the Risi Ferrari out of the race, and for which Vaxivière was strongly criticised. Prodrive chairman David Richards praised the "extraordinary" team effort of his Aston Martin team to win LMGTE Pro; Adam called his pursuit of Taylor "the stint of my life", saying that his team's reaction to his race-winning overtake of Taylor "was quite emotional".

Bamber, Bernhard and Hartley now led the Drivers' Championship with 83 points; Buemi, Davidson and Nakajima fell to second with 66, and Jarvis, Laurent and Tung moved from sixth to third. Porsche overtook Toyota to lead the Manufacturers' Championship by 28.5 points. Derani, Priaulx and Tincknell remained the GT World Endurance Drivers' Championship leaders, with Adam, Serra and Turner second. Ford took the GT World Endurance Manufacturers' Championship lead from Ferrari with six races remaining in the season.

Race result
The minimum number of laps for classification (70 percent of the overall winning car's race distance) was 257 laps. Class winners are in bold.

Championship standings after the race

 Note: Only the top five positions are included for the Drivers' Championship standings.

 Note: Only the top five positions are included for the Drivers' Championship standings.

Footnotes

References

External links

 

Le Mans
24 Hours of Le Mans races
Le Mans
Le Mans
24 Hours of Le Mans